The Graduate School of Social Work at the University of Denver (GSSW), is the oldest graduate school of social work in the Rocky Mountain Region.  Founded in 1931, GSSW is currently ranked 11th by U.S. News & World Report 

GSSW enrolls approximately  425 students in the Master of Social Work degree program and approximately 30 students in its doctor of social work program. The  program is accredited by the Council on Social Work Education (CSWE), a specialized accrediting body recognized by the Council on Post-Secondary Accreditation. The accreditation has been continuous since 1933.

Students can earn their online Master's of Social Work degree in as little as 18 months.

History
The school was founded in 1931 as a joint effort between The University of Denver's Department of Allied Social Services and community agencies such as Community Chest and the Denver chapter of the American Association of Social Workers (which later became National Association of Social Workers).  Continuously accredited by the  American Association of Professional Schools of Social Work since 1933, the program became known as the Graduate School of Social Work in 1942. In 1968, the school established one of the first doctoral programs in social work.   In 2006, the Institute for Human Animal Connection was founded, the first institute of its type housed within a school of social work.

Deans of the School 

The University of Denver's Graduate School of Social Work has had 9 Directors or Deans in the history of the school. In celebration of the universities 150th anniversary, staff member Nick Ota-Wang (Admissions & Social Media, 2011-2015), and with help and support from Dr. John Kayser (Professor Emeritus) the school published a monthly blog series about each of the former Directors and Deans of the School. The series can be viewed online.

 (Grace) Eleanor Kimble - 1931-1934 - Founding Director 
 Florence Hustinpiller - 1934 - 1947
 Emil M. Sunley ("Sun") - 1947 - 1971 - 1st Dean/3rd Director 
 Kenneth W. Kindelsperger - 1971-1978 
 Everne McCummings - 1978 - 1985 - 1st person of color to serve as GSSW Dean, 1st African American to serve as dean at the University of Denver 
 Katherine "Kay" Vail - 1985-1987 - Acting Dean 
 John "Jack" F. Jones- 1987-1996
 Catherine Foster Alter - 1996-2006
 James Herbert Williams - 2010 - 2016
 Amanda Moore McBride - effective July 1, 2016

Projects and Institutes
 The Bridge Project
 The Butler Institute for Families
 IHAC Institute for Human Animal Connection
 The GSSW Scholarship Project

References

External links
 

University of Denver
Schools of social work in the United States
1931 establishments in Colorado
Educational institutions established in 1931